Manuel Zúñiga Fernández (born 29 June 1960) is a Spanish retired footballer who played as a right midfielder, and is a manager.

He amassed La Liga totals of 323 games and 19 goals over the course of 12 seasons, mainly with Espanyol (nine years) but also Sevilla. He subsequently worked as a coach, in the lower leagues.

Club career
Zúñiga was born in Luciana, Ciudad Real. After starting professionally with lowly CD Calvo Sotelo in the third division, he signed with RCD Español in 1979, being immediately cast in the team's rotation at the age of 19.

After only three appearances in his second season, which also included a loan to Cádiz CF, he went on to average more than 30 La Liga matches per campaign in the following years, including 43 – with two goals – in 1986–87 as the Catalans qualified for the UEFA Cup. He helped them reach the final in the subsequent continental competition but missed his penalty in the shootout, in an eventual loss against Bayer 04 Leverkusen.

In the following three years, Zúñiga played for fellow league club Sevilla FC, where he still was regularly used. After 1991–92, spent with CE Sabadell FC in the second level, he moved to Écija Balompié, helping it promote to division two in 1995 and partnering Real Betis and Real Madrid legend Rafael Gordillo in 1995–96, following which he retired at the age of 36.

Subsequently, Zúñiga worked as a manager, never in higher than the third tier.

International career
A longtime member of the Spain U21 international, Zúñiga never earned a cap for the full side. He did represent the nation at the 1980 Summer Olympics.

References

External links

Stats and bio at Cadistas1910 

1960 births
Living people
Sportspeople from the Province of Ciudad Real
Spanish footballers
Association football midfielders
La Liga players
Segunda División players
Segunda División B players
CD Puertollano footballers
RCD Espanyol footballers
Cádiz CF players
Sevilla FC players
CE Sabadell FC footballers
Écija Balompié players
Spain youth international footballers
Spain under-21 international footballers
Spain under-23 international footballers
Spain amateur international footballers
Olympic footballers of Spain
Footballers at the 1980 Summer Olympics
Spanish football managers
Segunda División B managers
Écija Balompié managers
CD Puertollano managers